Rafael Perazza is a village in the San José Department of southern Uruguay.

Geography
Route 3 connects the town to the department capital, San José de Mayo,  to the north, as well as the capitals or main cities of the departments Flores, Río Negro, Paysandú, Salto and Artigas.

History
On 19 December 1957, its status was elevated to "Pueblo" (village) by the Act of Ley Nº 12.479.

Population
In 2011 Rafael Perazza had a population of 1,277.
 
Source: Instituto Nacional de Estadística de Uruguay

Places of worship
 Parish Church of Our Lady of Lourdes and St. Raphael (Roman Catholic)

References

External links
INE map of Rafael Perazza

Populated places in the San José Department